Nexus is a Latin word for connection, usually where multiple elements meet. It may refer to:

Arts, entertainment, and media

Fictional entities
 Nexus, a fictional place in the TV series Charmed (broadcast 1998–2006)
 Nexus, a large, insect-like Necromorph in the game Dead Space 3
 Nexus, a series of androids in the book Do Androids Dream of Electric Sheep? (1968) by Philip K. Dick 
 Nexus, the corresponding series of replicants in the film adaptation Blade Runner (1982)
 Nexus, a structure at the starting point of each team in League of Legends that the other team must destroy in order to win
 Nexus, the multiplayer meeting platform in the game No Man's Sky in the form of a space station
 Multiversal Nexus, the center of the DC Multiverse
 Planet Nexus, the main setting for the MMORPG WildStar
 The Nexus, the name of the setting of Heroes of the Storm
 The Nexus, a central hub used to bind together various worlds in the game Demon's Souls
 The Nexus, a communications complex in Quake 4
 The Nexus, a safe haven area in Realm of the Mad God
 The Nexus, the central plot element in the 1994 film Star Trek Generations
 The Nexus, a space station in the game Mass Effect: Andromeda
 Ultraman Nexus, the eponymous alien superhero broadcast 2004–2005
The Nexus, a place connecting multiple realms in The Death Gate Cycle

Gaming
 Nexus, the brand of the NexusMods online modding community
 Dragonlance Nexus, a fansite that was created in 1996 as "Dragon Realm"
 Nexus: The Jupiter Incident, a 2004 science fiction themed real-time tactics computer game
 Nexus: The Kingdom of the Winds, a 1996 Pay to Play MMORPG
 Ratchet & Clank: Into the Nexus, a platform game developed by Insomniac Games, also known as Ratchet & Clank: Nexus
 Nexus, a digital platform for various tabletop role-playing game tools created by Demiplane

Literature
 Nexus (comics), an American comic book series by Mike Baron and Steve Rude in 1981
 Nexus (Ramez Naam novel), 2012 cyberpunk thriller novel by Ramez Naam
 Nexus, the final novel published in 1959 in The Rosy Crucifixion trilogy by Henry Miller

Music

Groups and labels
 Nexus (Argentine band), a progressive rock band from Argentina
 Nexus (ensemble), a Toronto-based percussion ensemble that performs jazz, world music, and western avant-garde music
 Nexus (Estonian band), an Estonian pop band formed in 2003 which split up in 2006
 Nexus (Greek band), a Greek industrial rock band formed by vocalist/keyboardist Mike Pougounas
 The Nexus, a duo consisting of David Sneddon and James Bauer-Mein
 Nexus Music, a Danish record label and production company

Albums
 Nexus (Another Level album), 1999
 Nexus (Argent album), 1974
 Nexus (Sarah Fimm album), 2004
 Nexus (Gene Harris album), 1975
 Nexus (Pat Martino album), 2015
 The Nexus (album), by Aramanthe, 2013

Songs
 "Nexus" (ClariS song)
 "Nexus", a song from Bethlehem's 1998 album Sardonischer Untergang im Zeichen irreligiöser Darbietung
 "Nexus", a song from Dan Fogelberg's 1981 album The Innocent Age
 "Nexus", a song from Opshop's 2004 album You Are Here
"Nexus 4/Shine", a 2008 single by L'Arc-en-Ciel
 "The Nexus", a composition from the Astral Projection 2002 album Amen
 "The Nexus", the first single from Amaranthe's 2013 album The Nexus

Periodicals
 Nexus (magazine), a bi-monthly alternative news magazine
 Nexus (student magazine), the weekly students' magazine of the Waikato Students Union at the University of Waikato, New Zealand
 Daily Nexus, the university newspaper for the campus of the University of California, Santa Barbara, US

Wrestling
 The Nexus (professional wrestling), a defunct professional wrestling stable in the WWE

Brands and enterprises
 Nexus (animation studio), a Japanese animation studio
 NEXUS (non-profit), a non-profit organization headquartered in Washington, D.C.
 Nexus Audio Recording Studio, in Oakland, California, US
 Nexus Automotive, an importer and manufacturer in Pakistan
 Nexus Studios, an animation and film production company
 Tyne and Wear Passenger Transport Executive (brandname Nexus), the Passenger Transport Executive for the Tyne and Wear region, England

Facilities and structures
 Nexus (building), a high-rise building in Seattle, Washington, United States
 Nexus Place, a building in London owned by Tishman Speyer

Law and government
 NEXUS, a trusted traveler program of Canada and the US
 Nexus, a person under a debt bondage contract called a nexum in ancient Rome
 Nexus, an aspect of state income tax code in the US
 Nexus of contracts, a legal theory
 Nexus clause, provision of the Australian Constitution regarding the composition of parliament

Philosophy and metaphysics
 Nexus (process philosophy), a term coined by Alfred North Whitehead to show the network actual entity from universe
 Causal nexus, chain of causality between two or more processes

Science and technology

Biochemistry
 2C-B (or Nexus), a psychedelic drug of the 2C family
 Gap junction (or nexus), a specialized intercellular connection between a multitude of animal cell-types

Mobile devices
 Google Nexus, a discontinued line of Android devices co-manufactured by Google
 Nexus One, a 2010 smartphone co-manufactured with HTC
 Nexus Player, a 2014 digital media player co-manufactured with Asus
 Nexus Q, a 2012 digital media player

Other computing uses
 Nexus (data format), a common data format for neutron, X-ray, and muon science
 Nexus (standard), a standard debugging interface for embedded systems
 Nexus (web browser), the first web browser and editor
 Cisco Nexus switches, modular network switches designed for data centers
 Landmark Nexus, reservoir simulation software
 Nexus file, a widely used file format used in bioinformatics
 Nexus grammar, a system of analysing text which was first used in Denmark
 Sonatype's Nexus, a software repository manager

Transportation
 Nexus, the trading name of the Tyne and Wear Passenger Transport Executive in north-east England
 Gilera Nexus, a motorcycle by Gilera
 Nexus 30, a Class 30 radio controlled helicopter produced by Kyosho
 Nexus Mustang, a two place homebuilt aircraft
 Shimano Nexus, a brand of bicycle components (geared bicycle hubs)
 General Dynamics Nexus, a reusable rocket concept design created in the 1960s

Other uses
 NEXUS, an annual cultural festival of Sri Venkateswara College
 Water, energy and food security nexus
 Water-energy nexus

See also

 Nexis or LexisNexis, a research corporation 
 Nexxus, a line of hair care products
 North East Conference on Science and Skepticism (NCSS), run by the New England Skeptical Society